This is a list of monarchs (and other royalty and nobility) sorted by nickname.

This list is divided into two parts:
 Cognomens: Also called cognomina. These are names which are appended before or after the person's name, like the epitheton necessarium, or Roman victory titles. Examples are "William the Conqueror" for William I of England, and "Frederick Barbarossa" for Frederick I, Holy Roman Emperor.
 Sobriquets: Names which have become identified with a particular person, and are recognizable when used instead of the personal name. Some are used only in a particular context: for example, "Grandmother of Europe" for Queen Victoria is generally only used when referring to her family links throughout the royal families of Europe. On the other hand, in some cases the nickname supersedes the personal name, and the individual is referred to by this nickname even in scholarly works: for example, Roman emperor Gaius Julius Caesar Germanicus is universally known by his nickname, Caligula.

Notes:
 Nicknames are listed in each section alphabetically, ignoring articles and prepositions.
 Non-English words are rendered in italics, and translated where possible.
 When the name and nickname are rendered in a non-English language, the nickname will be in boldface italics.

Cognomen
A swung dash, or tilde (~) is used to indicate where the personal name occurs in the nickname; thus "~ the Accursed" means "Sviatopolk the Accursed".

A

 "~ the Abandoned": John I of Aragon (also known as John the Hunter or John the Lover of Elegance)
"~ the Absolutist": Miguel I of Portugal
"~ the Accursed":
Sviatopolk I of Kiev
Iskander the Accursed (Middle Persian: Gizistag Aleksandar; more commonly known as Alexander the Great)
Tekle Haymanot I of Ethiopia ( irgum tekle hāymānōt)
"~ the Adopted": Childebert of Austrasia
"~ (the) Ætheling": Edgar Ætheling of England
"~ the Affable": Charles VIII of France
"~ the African": Afonso V of Portugal
"~ the Aggressor": Indulf of Alba
 "~ the Alchemist": John, Margrave of Brandenburg-Kulmbach
"~ Albanian-slayer": Thomas of Epirus
"~ All-fair": Eadwig of England
"~ the Apostate": Julian, Roman Emperor
"~ the Arab": Philip I, Roman Emperor
"~ the Artist-King": Ferdinand II of Portugal
"~ the Asleep": Sebastian of Portugal
"~ the Astrologer": Alfonso X of Castile (more commonly known as Afonso the Wise)
"~ the Avenger": Alfonso XI of Castile (also known as Afonso the Just)

B
"~ the Bad": 
Alexander III of Wallachia (Romanian: Alexandru cel Rău)
Arnulf, Duke of Bavaria
Charles II of Navarre
Emund of Sweden (more commonly known as Emund the Old)
Mihnea of Wallachia (Romanian: Mihnea cel Rău)
Ordoño IV of León
Sigurd Magnusson, pretender of Norway ( or )
William I of Sicily
"~ the Bald":
Charles II of France
Baldwin II, Count of Flanders
Idwal ab Anarawd of Gwynedd
Radu II of Wallachia (Church Slavonic: Radu Praznaglava)
"~ Barbarossa": Frederick I, Holy Roman Emperor
"~ Barefoot" or "~ Bareleg": Magnus III of Norway
"~ Barn-Lock": Magnus III of Sweden
"~ the Bastard": 
Ebalus, Duke of Aquitaine
Henry II of Castile (more commonly known as Henry of Trastámara)
John I of Portugal (more commonly known John of Avis, John the Great, or John of Fond Memory)
"~ the Battler": Alfonso I of Aragon (also known as Alfonso the Warrior)
"~ the Bavarian": Louis IV of Germany
"~ the Bear": Albert the Bear
"~ the Bearded":
Baldwin IV, Count of Flanders
Berthold II, Duke of Carinthia
Constans II, Byzantine Emperor
Eberhard I, Duke of Württemberg
Egino IV, Count of Urach
Geoffrey III of Anjou
"~ Beauclerk" or "~ Beauclerc" (French, "Good Clerk"): Henry I of England
"~ the Beer Jug": John George I, Elector of Saxony
"~ the Beloved": Louis XV of France
"~ the Bewitched": Charles II of Spain
"~ the Bibliophile": Manuel II of Portugal (more commonly known as Manuel the Patriot or Manuel the Unfortunate)
"~ the Big Nest": Vsevolod III Yuriyevich of Vladimir
"~ the Black Prince": Edward the Black Prince
"~ the Black":
Leszek II the Black
Fulk III of Anjou
Henry III, Holy Roman Emperor (also called the pious)
Henry IX, Duke of Bavaria
Margaret II, Countess of Flanders
"~ the Blessed": Alexander I of Russia
"~ the Blind":
Boleslaus III of Bohemia (also known as Boleslaus the Red)
Béla II of Hungary
Magnus IV of Norway
Stefan Branković
Vasily II Vasiliyevich
Bogdan III of Moldavia
John of Bohemia
"~ the Blind Earl": Edward de Courtenay, 3rd/11th Earl of Devon
"~ the Blond": Selim II of the Ottoman Empire
"~ Bloodaxe": Eric I of Norway
"~ the Bloodthirsty": Ismail of Morocco
"Bloody ~": Mary I of England
"~ the Bloody": Nicholas II of Russia
"~ Bluetooth": Harold I of Denmark
"~ the Bold":
Boleslaw II of Poland
Charles of Burgundy
Philip the Bold
Philip III of France
"~ the Boneless": Ivar Ragnarsson
"~ the Bookish" or "~ the Book-Lover": Coloman of Hungary (more commonly known as Coloman the Learned)
"~ the Boulonnais": Afonso III of Portugal
"~ the Brash": Olof of Denmark
"~ the Brave":
Afonso IV of Portugal
Boleslaw I of Poland (also known as Boleslaw the Great)
Dan II of Wallachia
John III of Moldavia (Romanian: Ioan Vodă cel Viteaz; more commonly known as John the Terrible)
Michael of Wallachia, Transylvania and Moldavia
"~ the Brilliant": George V of Georgia
"~ the Broad-shouldered": Haakon II of Norway
"~ Broom-plant": Geoffrey V, Count of Anjou (also known as Geoffrey the Handsome or Geoffrey the Fair)
"~ the Brown": Donnchadh mac Flainn, High King of Ireland
"~ the Bruce": Robert I of Scotland
"~ Builder":
David IV of Georgia
Peter III of Portugal
"~ the Builder King": Leopold II of Belgium
"~ Bulgar-Slayer": Basil II, Byzantine Emperor

C
"~ Capet": Hugh Capet
"~ the Cabbage": Ivaylo of Bulgaria
"~ the Capacidónio": Peter III of Portugal (also known as Peter the Builder)
"~ the Cardinal-King": Henry, King of Portugal
"~ the Capuched": Sancho II of Portugal (also known as Sancho the Hooded or Sancho the Pious)
"~ the Catholic":
Alfonso I of Asturias
Andrew I of Hungary (more commonly known as Andrew the White)
Ferdinand II of Aragon
Isabella I of Castile
Peter II of Aragon
Frederick I, Duke of Austria
"~ the Caulker": Michael V, Byzantine Emperor (Michaíl Kalaphátis)
"~ the Ceremonious": Peter IV of Aragon
"~ the Chaste":
Alfonso II of Aragon (also known as Alfonso the Troubador)
Alfonso II of Asturias
Bolesław V the Chaste
Henry, King of Portugal
"~ the Chief": Kenneth III of Scotland
"~ the Child" 
Henry II, Margrave of Brandenburg-Stendal
Henry I, Landgrave of Hesse
Otto I, Duke of Brunswick-Luneburg
Louis III of East Francia
Louis of Sicily
Nicholas I, Lord of Rostock
"~ the Clement": John VI of Portugal
"~ the Clubfoot": Sverker I of Sweden
"~ Coal-Burner": Anund Jacob of Sweden 
"~ the Confessor": Edward the Confessor (of England), also known as Saint Edward
"~ the Colonizer": John III of Portugal
"~ the Conqueror":
Afonso I of Portugal
Charles V, Holy Roman Emperor
James I of Aragon
John V, Duke of Brittany
Mehmed II of The Ottoman Empire
Nicholas I of Russia
William I of England
Valdemar II of Denmark
"~ the Constable Prince": John, Constable of Portugal
"~ the Constant": John, Elector of Saxony
"~ Corvinus" (from Latin "like a raven"): Matthias Corvinus of Hungary
"~ the Courteous": William, Duke of Austria
"~ the Crosseyed": Vasili Kosoi, Muscovian usurper
"~ Crouchback":
Inge I of Norway
Richard III of England (also known as Crookback)
"~ the Cruel":
Boleslaus I of Bohemia
Boleslaus II of Poland
Louis XI of France
Peter I of Portugal
Peter of Castile
"~ the Crusader": 
Sigurd I of Norway
Robert II, Count of Flanders
Gaston IV, Viscount of Béarn
"~ the Curly" Bolesław IV the Curly
"~ Curthose" (Middle English, "short stockings"): Robert II, Duke of Normandy
"~ Curtmantle" (Middle English, "short cloak"): Henry II of England

D
"~ the Damned" or "~ the Accursed": Sviatopolk I of Kiev
"~ the Deacon": Bermudo I of Asturias
"~ the Debonaire": Louis I of France
"~ the Deed-Doer": Edmund I of England
"~ the Desired":
Ferdinand VII of Spain
Louis XVIII of France
Sebastian of Portugal 
"~ the Determined": Anthony I of Portugal
"~ the Devil":
Robert I, Duke of Normandy
Vlad II of Wallachia
Hugh VI, Lord of Lusignan
Robert II, Lord of Bellême
"~ the Diplomat": Charles I of Portugal
"~ Do-Nothing", "~ the Indolent" or "~ the Sluggard": Louis V of France
"~ Dracul" (Romanian, "The Devil" or "The Dragon"): Vlad II of Wallachia
"~ Dracula" (Romanian, "Son of the Devil" or "Son of the Dragon"): Vlad III of Wallachia
"~ the Drunkard":
Michael III, Byzantine Emperor
Selim II, Ottoman Emperor
Wenceslaus, King of the Romans
"~ the Dung-Named": Constantine V, Byzantine Emperor (Konstantínos E' Koprónymos)

E
"Earth-Shaker ~": Inca Yupanqui (Quechua: Pachakutiq Inka Yupanki)
"~ the Ecclesiastic" or "~ the Priest": Martin I of Aragon (Spanish: "Martín el Eclesiástico" o "el Cura")
"~ the Edifier": Peter III of Portugal
"~ the Educator": Maria II of Portugal
"~ the Elbow-High" or "The Ell-High": Władysław I of Poland
"~ the Elder":
Eadweard I of England (?)
Martin I of Aragon
Mircea I of Wallachia
Tarquin I (Latin: Tarquinius Senior)
Mircea I of Wallachia
Boso III of Turin
"~ the Eloquent": Edward of Portugal
"~ the Emperor-King": Charles V, Holy Roman Emperor
"~ the Emperor-Sacristan": Joseph II of Austria
"~ the Enabler": Peter III of Portugal
"~ the Enemy-Son": Peter I of Portugal
"~ the Enlightened": Charles III of Spain
"~ Epiphanes" (Greek "the manifest"): several Hellenistic kings, including
Ptolemy V Epiphanes 
"~ Euergetes" (Greek "the benefactor"): several Hellenistic kings, including
Ptolemy III Euergetes 
Ptolemy VIII Physcon 
"~ Eupator" (Greek "of noble father"):
 Antiochus V
 Mithridates VI of Pontus
 Ptolemy Eupator
"~ the Executioner": Mehmed I of the Ottoman Empire
"~ the Exile":
 Władysław II the Exile (')
 Edward the Exile

F
"~ the Fair":
Charles IV of France
Donald III of Scotland
Geoffrey V, Count of Anjou
Ivan II of Moscow
Louis I of France
Philip IV of France
Leopold II, Margrave of Austria()
"~ Fairhair": Harald I of Norway
"~ the Fair Sun": Vladimir I of Kiev
"Farmer ~": **George III of Great Britain
"~ the Farmer": Denis of Portugal
"~ The Swift(?): Eystein Halfdansson of Romerike and Vestfold
"~ the Fat":
Afonso II of Portugal
Charles III, Holy Roman Emperor
Conan III, Duke of Brittany
Henry I of Cyprus
Henry I of Navarre
Louis VI of France
Ptolemy VIII of Ptolemaic Egypt
Sancho I of León
"~ the Fearless": John the Fearless
"~ the Frank": Alfonso III of Aragon (also known as Alfonso the Liberal or Alfonso the Free)
"~ the Fighter": Anthony I of Portugal
"~ First-Crowned": Stefan of Raška
"~ Fitzempress": Henry II of England
"~ Flatnose": Ketil of Man
"~ Forkbeard": Sweyn I of Denmark ( or)
"~ the Fortunate":
Manuel I of Portugal
Dietrich of Oldenburg
Philip VI of France
"~ the Founder": Afonso I of Portugal
"~ the Fowler": Henry I of Germany ( or )
"~ the Fratricide":
Berengar Raymond II, Count of Barcelona
Francis I of Brittany 
Henry II of Castile
"~ From Overseas": Louis IV of France

G
"~ the Generous" or "~ the Liberal": 
Alfonso III of Aragon
Boleslaus II of Poland
Leopold, Duke of Bavaria
"~ the Gentle":
Rupert of Germany 
Frederick II, Elector of Saxony
Harald III of Denmark; see also "~ Hen" below
"~ the German": Louis I of the East Franks
"~ the Glorious":
Athelstan of England (Old English: Æþelstan, ætniman)
Elizabeth I of England (Gloriana)
Leopold VI, Duke of Austria
""~the God-Given": Louis XIV
"~ the God-Like One": Murad I, Ottoman Emperor
"~ the God-Loving": Andrey I Bogolubsky
"~ the Good":
Alfonso IV of Aragon
Alexandru of Moldavia
Fulk II of Anjou (?)
Hywel ap Cadell of Wales
Haakon I of Norway
John I of Portugal
John II of France
Louis I of Holland
Magnus I of Norway
Philip III of Burgundy
William II of Sicily
" Good King ~": 
Edward III of England (Good King Edward)
Henry IV of France (Bon Roi Henri)
René of Two Sicilies (then deposed, remained duke of Anjou and count of Provence)
Wenceslas I of Bohemia (Good King Wenceslas)
"~ Good Queen": Elizabeth I of England (Good Queen Bess)
"~ of Good Memory" or "~ the One with Good Memory": John I of Portugal
"~ the Good Mother": Maria II of Portugal
"~ the Gouty": 
Piero I de Medici of Florence
Bermudo II of León
"~ the Great": see List of people known as The Great
"the Great Elector": Frederick William, Elector of Brandenburg
"~ Greyfell" or "~ Greyhide": Harald II of Norway
"~ Greymantle": Geoffrey I of Anjou
"~ the Grim" or "~ the Brave" or "~ the Inexorable": Selim I of the Ottoman Empire
"~ the Grocer-King" or "~ the Spices-King": Manuel I of Portugal (and ), a nickname given to him by Francis I of France with a double entendre, as the French word épicier refers to a grocer, and is derived from épice, "spice")
"~ Gylle": (Old Norse, "Servant"): Harald IV of Norway

H
"~ the Hairy": Wilfred I of Urgel
"~ the Hammer":
Charles Martel of the Franks
Geoffrey II of Anjou
Geoffrey IV of Anjou
"~ The Hammer of the Scots": Edward I of England (see also Longshanks below).
"~ the Handsome":
Ferdinand I of Portugal
Frederick I of Austria
John II Komnenos, Byzantine Emperor
Philip I of Spain
Radu of Wallachia
"~ the Hardy": Canute III of Denmark
"~ Hardrada" (from Old Norse "Harðráði", "Stern Counsel"): Harald III of Norway
"~ Harefoot": Harold I of England
"~ the Hero of Two Worlds": Peter I of Brazil & IV of Portugal
"~ the Hidden": Sebastian of Portugal
"~ the Holy":
Canute IV of Denmark
Eric IX of Sweden
Olaf II of Norway
"~ the Holy Prince": Ferdinand of Portugal
"~ the Hopeful": Peter V of Portugal
"~ the Hunchback": Pippin the Hunchback
"~ the Humane" or "~ the Humanist": Martin I of Aragon
"~ Hunger": Olaf I of Denmark
"~ the Hunter":
Gudrød
John I of Aragon
Mehmed IV of the Ottoman Empire
"~ the Hunter-King":
Charles I of Portugal

I
"~ the Ill-Tempered": Fulk IV of Anjou
"~ the Illustrious":
Otto II, Duke of Bavaria
Otto I, Duke of Saxony
Henry III, Margrave of Meissen
Leopold I, Margrave of Austria
"~ the Impaler": Vlad III of Wallachia
"~ the Impotent" Henry IV of Castile
"~ the Inconstant" or "~ the Fickle": Ferdinand I of Portugal
"~ the Indolent": Louis V of France
"~ the Independentist": Anthony I of Portugal
"~ the Invincible": Demetrius I of Bactria
"~ the Iron": 
Ernest of Austria
Louis II, Landgrave of Thuringia
Henry II, Landgrave of Hesse
Henry II, Count of Holstein-Rendsburg
Henry III, Duke of Żagań
Frederick II, Elector of Brandenburg
"~ Ironside":
Edmund II of England
Björn Ironside

J
"~ the Just":
Casimir II, Duke of Poland
Ferdinand VI of Spain
James II of Aragon
Leopold III, Duke of Austria
Louis XIII of France
Matthias I of Hungary
Peter I of Portugal
Bayezid II, Sultan of the Ottoman Empire

K
"~ the Kind":
Alexandru of Moldavia
Alfonso IV of Aragon
"~ the Kind-Hearted": Eric I of Denmark
"~ the Khazar" (Gr. Chozar): Leo IV of the Byzantine Empire

L
"~ Lackland": 
John of England
John, Count of Eu
Henry I, Margrave of Brandenburg-Stendal
"~ the Lamb": Eric III of Denmark
"~ the Lame":
Timur
Sigobert King of the Ripuarian Franks
See also under "the Lisp and Lame" below
"~ the Last":
Llywelyn ap Gruffudd of Wales
Louis XVI of France
"~ Law-Mender": Magnus VI of Norway
"~ the Lawgiver":
Eric IX of Sweden
Henry II of England
Magnus VI of Norway
Süleyman I of the Ottoman Empire
"~ the Learned": Alfonso X of Castile
"~ the Leprous": Afonso II of Portugal
"~ the Liberal":
Alfonso III of Aragon
Edward of Savoy
Henry I of Champagne
"~ the Liberator":
Alexander II of Russia
Pedro I of Brazil and IV of Portugal
"~ the Lion":
Albert II of Mecklenburg
Brian Boruma of Ireland
Heinrich II, Lord of Mecklenburg
Henry III, Duke of Saxony
Louis VIII of France
William I of Scotland (Mediaeval Gaelic: Uilliam mac Eanric)
Richard I of England
"~ the Lionheart": Richard I of England
"~ the Lisp and Lame" Eric XI of Sweden
"~ the Little Impaler": Basarab Ţepeluş cel Tânăr of Wallachia
"~ (the) Longhaired (king)": Chlodio
"~ Longshanks": Edward I of England
"~ the Lover of Elegance": John I of Aragon

M
"~ the Mad":
Charles VI of France
Joanna of Castile
Ludwig II of Bavaria
Maria I of Portugal
"~ the Madman": Donald II of Scotland
"~ the Magnanimous":
Emperor Pedro II of Brazil
King Alfonso V of Aragon
John Frederick I, Elector of Saxony
Otto Henry, Elector Palatine
King John V of Portugal
Landgrave Philipp I of Hesse
King Ladislaus of Naples
Inca Roca (Quechua: Inka Roq'a)
Charles II of Alençon
"~ the Magnificent":
Amenhotep III, Pharaoh of Egypt
Edmund I of England
Lorenzo de' Medici
Robert I of Normandy
Suleiman I of the Ottoman Empire
Thomas de Berkeley, 5th Baron Berkeley
"~ the Maiden":
Eystein of Norway
 Malcolm IV of Scotland
"~ Martel" (Old French, "The Hammer"):
Charles Martel of the Franks
Geoffrey II of Anjou
Geoffrey IV of Anjou
"~ the Man": John II of Portugal (a nickname given to him by Isabella of Castile)
"~ the Martyr":
Edward the Martyr of England
King Charles I of England
Charles I of Portugal
Nicholas II of Russia
"~ the Master of Avis": John I of Portugal (a reference to his position as Master of the Order of Avis before his election as King)
"~ the Memorable": Eric II of Denmark
"~ the Merry": Charles II of England
"~ the Mild": Halfdan of Romerike and Vestfold
"~ the Middle": Pippin of Herstal
"~ the Mighty": Stephen Uroš IV Dušan of Serbia
"~ Minus-a-Quarter": Michael VII Dukas, Byzantine Emperor
"~ Moneybags": Ivan I of Russia
"~ the Monk":
Alfonso IV of Leon
Fortun I of Pamplona
Ramiro II of Aragon
Vlad IV of Wallachia
"~ Monk's-Cloak"?: Jon Kuvlung of Norway
"~ Monomakh" (Russian "", from Greek "", "One who fights alone"): Vladimir Monomakh of Kiev
"~ Monomakhos" (from Greek "", "One who fights alone"): Constantine IX, Byzantine Emperor
"~ the Moor": Ludovico Sforza, Duke of Milan
"the Most Beautiful ~": Maria of Portugal, Queen of Castile
"Mother ~": Menelik II of Ethiopia ( imiyē Minīlik

"~ the Missed-King": Manuel II of Portugal
"The Mouth": Sigurd II of Norway
"~ the Musician-King:
John IV of Portugal
Louis I of Portugal

N
"~ the Navigator": Henry of Portugal
"~ New-Day": Valdemar IV of Denmark
"~ of the Nine Hostages": Niall Noigíallach
"~ the Noble":
Charles III of Navarre
Magnus I of Norway
"~ No-Counsel" or "~ the Unready": Ethelred II of England
"~ the Nun's-Lover": John V of Portugal

O
"The Oath-Taker": Henry III of Reuss (1337–1378)
"The Oberhofrichter": Henry of Reuss-Plauen (1271–1303)
"The Oceanographer":
Albert I, Prince of Monaco
Charles I of Portugal (Portuguese: Carlos o oceanógrafo)
"~ The Old" (Cat. el Vell, Fr. l'Ancien, le Vieux, Nor. den Gamle, Pol. Stary, Rum. cel Batran, Sp. el Velloso, Swe. den Gamle, Tgl. Matanda):
Ache of Luzon (c. 1480–1572)
Albert I of Carpi
Albert II of Wedenberg-Heiligenberg (1327–1370)
Arnulf I, Count of Flanders (also known as "the great"
Basarab Laiota, Prince of Wallachia
Boso I, Count of La Marche
Coel Hen (Welsh for "Coel the Old"; king of the Brittonic "Hen Ogledd" ("Old North"); possibly legendary)
Konrad III of Silesia
Dyfnwal Hen (Welsh for "Dyfnwal the Old") of Alt Clut
Emund II of Sweden
Eric I, Duke of Brunswick-Lüneburg, 1495–1540
Frederick the Great (Prussia), also named "the Old Fritz"
George V, Count of Nassau-Dillenburg, 1620–1623
Gorm of Denmark
Guthrum
Haakon IV of Norway
Igor of Kiev
Michael II of Beloozero (1432–1486)
Mieszko III of Poland
Pippin of Landen
Raymond VI of Toulouse
Raymond Berengar I, Count of Barcelona
Rudolph II, Count of Habsburg (died 1232); also "the Kind"
Sigismund I of Poland
Theodore II of Beloozero (13??-1380)
William, Count of Nassau, 1538–1559
"The Old Dessauer": Leopold I of Anhalt-Dessau
"The One-Eyed" (Ger. der Einaugige):
John II, Count of Holstein-Kiel
William I, Margrave of Meissen
"~ the One-Eyed":
Fortun I of Pamplona
Antigonus I Monophthalmus
Wenceslaus I of Bohemia
Raymond IV, Count of Toulouse 
"The Oppressed": Dietrich, Margrave of Meissen
"~ the Oppressor": Philip IV of Spain
"The Orphan": Henry I of Reuss (1250–1295)
"~ the Outlaw": Edgar Ætheling of England
"~ d'Outremer" (French, "from Overseas"): Louis IV of France

P
"~ the Pacific": Peter II of Portugal
"~ the Painter-King":
Charles I of Portugal
Louis I of Portugal
"~ the Pale": Constantius I, Roman Emperor
"~ the Patriot": Manuel II of Portugal
"~ the Peaceful":
Edgar of England
Olaf III of Norway
Aymon, Count of Savoy
Amadeus VIII, Duke of Savoy
"~ the Peacemaker":
Alexander III of Russia
Alfonso XII of Spain
"~ the Perfect Prince": John II of Portugal
"~ the Philosopher" or "~ the Philosopher King": Edward of Portugal ( or )
"~ the Pilgrim:
Ermengol II, Count of Urgell
Henry I, Lord of Mecklenburg
"~ the Pious":
Boleslav II of Bohemia
Edward VI, King of England
John III of Portugal
Louis I of France
Maria I of Portugal
Philip III of Spain
Robert II of France
Sancho II of Portugal
William V, Duke of Bavaria
Otto III, Margrave of Brandenburg
"~ Ploughpenny": Eric IV of Denmark
"~ the Poet" or "~ the Poet King": Denis of Portugal ( or )
"The Poet Prince": Hywel ab Owain Gwynedd 
"~ the Poison King": Mithridates VI of Pontus
"~ the Popular": Louis I of Portugal
"~ the Populator": Sancho I of Portugal
"~ the Posthumous":
John I of France
Ladislaus I of Bohemia
Theobald IV of Champagne
"~ the Powerful": Uroš IV of Serbia
"~ the Precious": Stephen II of Serbia
"~ the Priest Hater": Eric II of Norway
"~ the Prior of Crato": Anthony I of Portugal (a reference to his position as Master of the Portuguese branch of the Order of the Knights of St. John of Jerusalem (Hospitaller) before his acclamation as King)
"~ the Proud":
Simeon of Moscow
Tarquin the Proud
"~ the Prudent":
Louis XI of France (French: Louis le Prudent)
Philip II of Spain
"~ the Purple-Born" (Greek Porphyrogenetes):
Baldwin II of Constantinople
Constantine VII, Byzantine Emperor

Q
"~ the Quarreller":
Frederick of Saxony
Louis X of France
"~ the Queen of Sad Mischance": Isabella II of Spain
"~ the Quiet": Olaf III of Norway

R
"~ the Rash": James III of Majorca
"~ the Red":
Håkan of Sweden
Fulk I of Anjou
John I, Duke of Brittany
Odo I, Duke of Burgundy
Otto II, Holy Roman Emperor
William II of England (Latin: William Rufus)
Rupert I, Elector Palatine
Ralph I, Count of Clermont
"~ the Red King": Macbeth of Scotland
"~ the Redemptress": Isabel of Brazil
"~ the Redless" or "~ the Redeless": Ethelred II of England
"~ the Reformer": Joseph I of Portugal
"~ the Resistant": Anthony I of Portugal
"~ the Restorer":
Casimir I of Poland
García Ramírez of Navarre
Mehmed I of the Ottoman Empire
John IV of Portugal
"~ the Righteous": 
Rupert of Germany
Henry IV of Silesia
Frederick IV, Elector Palatine
"~ the Rightly Guided": Harun al-Rashid
"~ the Romanslayer": Kaloyan (Bulgarian: Калоян ромеубиеца)
"~ Roundhead": Ragnvald of Sweden (the exact meaning of the nickname is unclear)

S
"~ the Sacrificer": Sweyn of Sweden (unclear if "Sven" was his actual name or part of the nickname)
"~ the Sacristan": Peter III of Portugal
"~ the Sailor King": William IV of the United Kingdom
"~ the Saint": 
 Edward the Confessor, also known as Saint Edward
Ferdinand III of Castile
Lulach of Scotland
Louis IX of France
William X, Duke of Aquitaine
Leopold III, Margrave of Austria
Louis IV, Landgrave of Thuringia
Raymond Benergar IV, Count of Barcelona 
"~ the Saver of Europe": Tervel of Bulgaria
"~ the Savior": 
Ptolemy I Soter
Ptolemy IX Soter
Antiochus I Soter
Demetrius I Soter
Diodotus I Soter
Menander I Soter
"~ the Seer": Oleg of Novgorod
"~ of the Seven Parts (of the World)": Peter, Duke of Coimbra
"~ the She-Wolf of France: Isabella of France
"~ the Be-shitten": James II of England and Ireland, also James VII of Scotland
"~ the Short": Pippin III, King of the Franks
"~ of Showers": Niall Frossach, High King of Ireland
"~ the Silent":
Olav III of Norway
William I of Orange
"~ the Simple": 
Charles III of France
William, Count of Sully
Frederick III of Sicily
Peter II, Duke of Brittany
"~ the Singer": David III of Ethiopia ( Dawīt āzimarī)
"~ Skötkonung" (Old Norse "Tax-King"?): Olof of Sweden
"~ the Sluggard": Louis V of France
"~ the Soldier": Victor Emmanuel III of Italy
"~ the Soldier-King":
Frederick William I of Prussia
Peter IV of Portugal
Albert I of Belgium (French: le Roi-Soldat or le Roi-Chevalier)
"~ the Sorcerer": Vseslav of Polotsk
"~ the Sorrowful": Manuel II of Portugal
"~ the Spider": Louis XI of France (l'Universelle Aragne)
"~ the Spirited": Philip V of Spain
"~ Split-Nose": Justinian II, Byzantine Emperor
"~ the Stammerer": Louis II of France
"~ the Stout": Olaf II of Norway
"The Strict": 
Louis II, Duke of Bavaria
Boleslaus I, Duke of Jawor
Frederick III, Landgrave of Thuringia
"~ the Strong":
Augustus II the Strong
Magnus Nilsson, Swedish pretender
Sancho VII of Navarre
Uroš IV of Serbia
"~ the Studious": Manuel II of Portugal
"~ the Stutterer": Peter I of Portugal
"~ the Sun King": Louis XIV of France
"The Portuguese Sun King": John V of Portugal

T
"~ the Tall":
Canute II of Sweden
Philip V of France (Philippe le Long)
Stephen of Serbia
Thorkell of East Anglia
"~ the Terrible":
Charles, Duke of Burgundy
Ivan IV of Russia (Ivan Groznyy)
Shingas
Krum of Bulgaria
"~ the Theologian": John I of Mecklenburg
"~ the Thunderbolt": 
Bayezid I, Ottoman Sultan
Ptolemy, King of Macedon (
"~ the Till-the-End-of-the-World-Passionate": Peter I of Portugal
"~ the Tough": Helen of Bosnia
"~ the Traditionalist": Miguel I of Portugal
"~ the Traditional Queen": Isabella II of Spain
"~ Transmarinus": (Latin: transmarinus "from Outerseas") Louis IV of France
"~ the Treacherous": Leonor Telles de Meneses
"~ the Trembling": Garcia IV of Pamplona
"~ the Tremulous": Garcia II of Navarre
"~ of the Tributes": Brian Boru, High King of Ireland
"~ the Troubadour":
Alfonso II of Aragon
Dinis of Portugal
Theobald I of Navarre (also called Theobald the Posthumous)
"~ Twistedbeard": Alan II, Duke of Brittany
"~ the Tyrant":
Christian II of Denmark (In Sweden)
Philip IV of Spain

U

"~ the Unfortunate": Manuel II of Portugal
"~ the Unique": Frederick II of Prussia
"~ the Unlucky":
Arnulf III of Flanders
Henry III of Reuss
"~ the Unready": Ethelred II of England
"~ the Usurper":
Mauregato of Asturias
Miguel I of Portugal

V
"~ the Vain": James I of England (VI of Scots)
"~ the Valiant": 
John IV, Duke of Brittany, (John V in some English sources)
Ralph I, Count of Vermandois
Theodoric II, Duke of Lorraine
Rudolph, Duke of Lorraine
"~ the Venetian": Andrew III of Hungary (& III of Croatia)
"~ the Vengeful": Peter I of Portugal
"~ the Victorious":
Afonso VI of Portugal
Charles VII of France
Eric of Sweden
Frederick I of the Palatinate
Valdemar II of Denmark (also "Valdemar the Conqueror")
"~ the Virgin Queen": Elizabeth I of England
"~the Virtuous": Leopold V, Duke of Austria

W
"~ the Warlike":
Albert, Prince of Beyreuth
Bernard VII of Lippe
Frederick I, Elector of Saxony
Frederick II of Austria
Herman of Schwarzenberg
Michael VI, Byzantine Emperor
Svyatoslav I of Kiev
"~ the Warrior": Charles I of Savoy
"~ the Weak": Uroš V of Serbia
"~ Wearing-a-Cape": Hugh Capet of France
"~ the Well-Beloved":
Charles VI of France
Louis I of Spain
"~ the Well-Served": Charles VII of France
"~ the Wench of Queluz": Carlota Joaquina, Queen of Portugal
"~ the White":
Henry III of Silesia
Leszek I of Poland
"~ Whiteshirt":
Haraldr Whiteshirt
"~ Who-Fights-Alone":
Constantine IX, Byzantine Emperor
Vladimir Monomakh of Kiev
"~ the Wicked":
Ordoño IV of León
Yazdegerd I of Persia
"~ the Wise":
Albert II of Austria
Albert IV of Bavaria
Alfonso X of Castile
Charles V of France
Coloman of Hungary
Frederick II of the Palatinate
Frederick III, Elector of Saxony
Leo VI, Byzantine Emperor
Mandukhai Khatun, empress of the Mongol Empire
Robert of Naples
Sancho VI of Navarre
William IV of Hesse-Kassel (or Hesse-Cassel)
Yaroslav I of KievBritannica Academic
"~ the Wrymouth": Boleslaus III of Poland

Y
"Yellow ~" or "~ the Blond": Selim II of the Ottoman Empire
"~ the Young":
Basarab Ţepeluş of Wallachia
Fulk V of Anjou
"~ the Young King": Henry the Young King
"~ the Younger":
Conrad II of Sicily 
Martin I of Sicily
Louis VII of France
Pippin III, King of the Franks (or ); see also "~ the Short", above

Sobriquets
"The Accursed": Genghis Khan
"The Alexander of the West": Henry II of England
"Alix": Alexandra of Denmark
"Bertie": George VI of the United Kingdom
"Bonnie Prince Charlie": Charles Edward Stuart, United Kingdom
"Caligula" ("Little Boots"): Gaius Julius Caesar Germanicus, Roman Emperor
"Caracalla" ("Hooded Tunic"): Marcus Aurelius Antoninus, Roman Emperor
"Cecco Peppe" (Italian, diminutive of Francesco Giuseppe): Franz Joseph I of Austria
"Champion of the Reformation": John Frederick I, Elector of Saxony
"Daisy": Margrethe II of Denmark
"Dickie": Louis Mountbatten
"Dominus Mundi": Henry VI, Holy Roman Emperor
"Ducky": Princess Victoria Melita of Saxe-Coburg and Gotha
"the Emperor of Universal Dominion": Charles V, Holy Roman Emperor
"Emperor-Sacristan": Joseph II, Holy Roman Emperor 
"Ena": Victoria Eugenie of Battenberg
"Farmer George": George III of the United Kingdom
"Father of England" Edward III of England
"Father of Europe" (Latin: "Pater Europae"): Charlemagne
"Father-in-law of Europe": 
 Christian IX of Denmark
 Nicholas I of Montenegro
"First Gentleman of Europe": Louis XV of France
"Fox of Mecklenburg": Albert II of Mecklenburg
"Gloriana": Elizabeth I of England
"Good King Edward": Edward III of England
"Good King Henry" (French: "le bon roi Henri"): Henry IV of France
"Good Queen Bess": Elizabeth I of England
"Grandfather of Europe": Miguel I of Portugal
"Grandmother of Europe": Queen Victoria
"The Great Belly-Gerent": Frederick I of Württemberg
"The Great Elector" (German: "Großer Kurfürst"): Frederick William, Elector of Brandenburg
"Greek Nicky": Prince Nicholas of Greece and Denmark
"Hammer of the North": Harald III of Norway
"Hammer of the Scots": Edward I of England
"Harry": Maud of the United Kingdom
"He of the Little Dagger" (Catalan: "el del Punyalet"): Peter IV of Aragon
"The Huckster King": Henry VII of England
"The Iron and Golden King": Ottokar II of Bohemia (Czech: "Král železný a zlatý")
"The Iron Duke": Fernando Álvarez de Toledo, Duke of Alva (Dutch: "IJzeren Hertog")
"The Iron Pope" (Italian: Il Papa Ferreo): Pope Sixtus V
"Kaiser Bill": Wilhelm II, German Emperor
"The King of May" (Italian: "Re di maggio"): Umberto II of Italy
"The King of the Seas" Edward III of England
"The Last Emperor": Puyi of China (Chinese: 末代皇帝)
"The Last Knight": Maximilian I, Holy Roman Emperor
"Lion of Justice": Henry I of England; Henry II of England
"Lilibet": Elizabeth II of the United Kingdom
"Lion of the North": Gustavus Adolphus of Sweden
"The Little Corporal": Napoleon I of France
"Little Sabre" (Italian: "Sciaboletta"): Victor Emmanuel III of Italy
"May": Mary of Teck
"Missy": Marie of Romania
"The Merry Monarch" or "The Merrie Monarch":
Charles II of England
Kalākaua of Hawaiʻi
"Mrs Brown": Queen Victoria. Refers to the Queen's relationship with her personal attendant, John Brown.
"Napoleon of the Pacific": Kamehameha I of Hawaiʻi
"Nicky": Nicholas II of Russia
"The Nine Days Queen": Lady Jane Grey
"Old Coppernose": Henry VIII of England
"The One Of The Little Dagger": (Catalan: "El del Punyalet"): Peter IV of Aragon
"The People's King": Lunalilo of Hawaii
"The Pious Grandfather" (Italian: Il Pio Nonno, a pun on the Italian form of his regnal name, Pio Nono): Pope Pius IX
"The Prince of Whales": George IV of the United Kingdom. Note that it is Whales instead of Wales. George was indeed the Prince of Wales during his regency, while he was also quite obese. Political satirical cartoons at the time would make fun of his obesity and portray him as a massive whale.
"The Sailor King": William IV of the United Kingdom
"The Scourge of God": Attila the Hun
"Skanderbeg" (from Albanian Skënderbeu, "Lord Alexander"): George Kastrioti of Albania
"Sissi/Sisi": Empress Elisabeth of Austria
"Soft-Sword": John of England
"Stupid Willy" (Polish: "Głupi Wiluś"): Wilhelm II of Germany
"Stupor Mundi": Frederick II, Holy Roman Emperor
"The Sun King" (French: "Le Roi Soleil"): Louis XIV of France
"The Tennis King": Gustav V of Sweden
"The Theater King": Gustav III of Sweden
"Thief of Cairo": Farouk of Egypt
"The Uncle of Europe": Edward VII of the United Kingdom
"The Universal Spider" (Old French: "l'universelle aragne"): Louis XI of France
"The Virgin Queen": Elizabeth I of England 
"The Warrior King": Abdullah II of Jordan
"The Warrior Pope" (Italian: Il Papa Guerriero): Pope Julius II
"The Winter King": Frederick I of Bohemia
"The Wisest Fool In Christendom": James I of England
"The World-Emperor": Charles V, Holy Roman Emperor

See also

 Epithet
 Nickname
 Sobriquet
 Victory titles
 List of people known as The Great
 List of royal saints and martyrs
 List of military figures by nickname
 Lists of nicknames

Notes

References

Further reading
Ross, Martha. Rulers and Governments of the World – Vol 1, Earliest Times to 1491, Bowker Publishing Company Ltd, London & New York, 1978. 

Nickname
Monarchs
Epithets
Nicknames in royalty